Jönssonligan – Den perfekta stöten (Johnson Gang – The Master Plan, called Mastermind outside of Scandinavia) is a 2015 Swedish heist thriller comedy film, directed by Alain Darborg. The film is a reboot of the Swedish film series Jönssonligan, and stars Simon J. Berger, Alexander Karim, Torkel Petersson, Susanne Thorson, Andrea Edwards, and Jens Hultén. The creators have tried to make a thriller, unlike the previous films which have been comedies.

Jönssonligan – Den perfekta stöten was released on January 16, 2015 to middling reviews and poor box office. Critics and audiences felt the film lacked the comedic style they felt the franchise should have.

Plot 
Charles-Ingvar Jönsson (Simon J. Berger), are together with his uncle Ralf, Stockholm's most skilled car thieves. But one day a robbery goes wrong and Ralf is murdered, while Charles-Ingvar is framed for the murder. To take revenge on Ralf's killer, the corrupt business woman Wallentin (Andrea Edwards), the banking director of Wallentin Exchange, Charles-Ingvar makes a plan to implement the most complicated heist in the history of Sweden.

He recruits the fraudster Ragnar Vanheden (Alexander Karim), explosives expert Harry (Torkel Petersson), and lock specialist Rocky (Susanne Thorson), who is also Charles-Ingvar's ex-girlfriend, to help him in his revenge mission.

Cast 
 Simon J. Berger as Charles-Ingvar Jönsson
 Edvin Ryding portrays a younger Charles-Ingvar.
 Alexander Karim as Ragnar Vanheden
 Torkel Petersson as Dynamit-Harry
 Susanne Thorson as Rocky
 Andrea Edwards as Wallentin
 Jens Hultén as Krantz
 Niklas Falk as Ralf
 Irma Hjort Erixson as Anja
 Juan Rodríguez as Alejandro
 Anki Larsson as School counselor
 Alexandra Alegren as Wallentin's secretary
 Ramtin Parvaneh as Keeper

Production

Development 
Over the years there had been plans to continue the film series, but these never became a reality. In 2011, Ulf Brunnberg, who played Vanheden in the eight original films, stated that he and Björn Gustafson would like to do some more films, if Gösta Ekman was coming back as Charles-Ingvar Jönsson. He said that he had tried to persuade Ekman without success. Since Ekman at that time already decided not to work anymore, Brunnberg did not think that there would be no more films. There were also plans to make more films about Lilla Jönssonligan. There has also been an idea to make a film in which the members are a little older (perhaps around 16–20 years of age) about how it all began, a little in the style of the film Kenny Begins (2009).

The production company Tre Vänner secured the rights to three new films about Jönssonligan in September 2011. These films would become reboots, with a new and younger cast. The film is separate in storyline's terms from the previous films.

The film was titled Jönssonligan – Den perfekta stöten, directed by Alain Darborg, as his directorial debut, and produced by Fredrik Wikström Nicastro, who also produced the 2010 film Easy Money, and its two sequels.

Casting 
The gang members were portrayed by Simon J. Berger as Charles-Ingvar Jönsson, Torkel Petersson as Harry, Alexander Karim as Vanheden, and Susanne Thorson as Rocky. Andrea Edwards and Jens Hultén were cast as the film's villains, who according to the film's producer Fredrik Wikstrom Nicastro are more reliable than previous villains in the series.

Filming 
The filming started in late October 2013, and was released on January 16, 2015.

Reception 
In Sweden, the film received mixed to negative reviews. In Expressen, the reviewer gave it 3 out of 5, calling it "sympathetically light-hearted, exciting, well-played and appealing", and a "somewhat clumsier version of Soderbergh's 'Ocean'-movies". In Dagens Nyheter, the reviewer gave it the same rating, praising the chemistry of the ensemble and calling the movie generally entertaining. A more negative review is found in Göteborgs-Posten, where the film got 2 out of 5 and was described as "not funny enough to work as a comedy and not thrilling enough to work as a gangster action movie".

The film was not commercially successful.

Cancelled sequel 
In conjunction with the premiere of the film, the film's producer Fredrik Wikström Nicastro, revealed that two sequels were planned to be released in the near future, saying that they had two scripts ready for production, but that was ultimately up to the moviegoers to decide if they should go ahead with the sequels. This was cancelled in the light of negative critical and commercial reception of the film. A second reboot was released in 2020.

References

External links 
 
 

Swedish action films
Swedish adventure comedy films
2010s adventure comedy films
Jönssonligan films
Films directed by Alain Darborg
Films set in Stockholm
Films shot in Stockholm
Reboot films
Tre Vänner films
2010s heist films
2015 films
2015 in Sweden
2015 directorial debut films
2010s Swedish-language films
2010s Swedish films